Novosibirsk Specialized Music School was founded in 1970, and in 2003 was officially designated by the State Duma a school for children with exceptional ability in the arts. It is one of only two music schools in Russia directly subordinate to the Ministry of Culture.

Nearly 180 young musicians from Novosibirsk, different cities of Russia and other countries study at 5 departments. Students of the college repeatedly win First prizes of international and all-Russian competitions. Also, college students often play in most famous concert halls in Russia, United States, Italy, Germany, Japan, Great Britain, France, Switzerland, Brazil, Korea. The names of graduates of school are known in many countries. They are Vadim Repin, Anton Barachovsky, Maxim Vengerov, I. Konovalov, A. Trostyansky (violin), T. Chernichka, I. Rashkovsky (piano), S. Yankovsky (clarinet), R. Zhbanov (button-accordion), A. Kugaevsky (domra) and many others. Every year about 40 persons of the college become grand aided students of Russia Ministry of Culture, Novosibirsk regional and city administrations, Vladimir Spivakov's International Charity Foundation, V. Repin and the chief counsel of the school.

References

External links
 Official website

Schools in Russia
Education in Novosibirsk